Bachelor of Architecture (India) is an education pursued after 10+2 and clearing  National Aptitude Test in Architecture conducted by Council of Architecture for a career in Architecture. They perform various roles in private or government organisations as architectural designer, architectural engineer, architectural draftsman, architectural assistant, Indian Railways, Defence Ministry, Municipal Corporation, National Building Organization, National Institutes of Urban Affairs and government architects.

Background 
Bachelor of Architecture (India) is a course pursued by a student who is interested in basic form of designing and construction of structures.

Eligiblity 
Bachelor of Architecture (India) can be pursued by anyone who has the following qualifications:
 Is a pass out of class 12th Board exams having subjects Maths, Physics and Chemistry with 50 percent aggregate from a recognised university or institution.
 Cleared entrance exam with required percentage for enrolling in Bachelor of Architecture course.
 Qualify in paper 2 of Joint Entrance Examination Mains in addition to entrance exams for Bachelor of Architecture course. National Aptitude Test in Architecture (NATA) and the Architecture Aptitude Test (AAT) are two main entrance examinations conducted for enrolling in the Bachelor of Architecture course.
 or cleared diploma exams in 10+3 course model compulsorily having Mathematics and having scored 50 percent aggregate.

Further education 
Bachelor of Architecture (India) can pursure Masters in Architecture as a post graduate degree with below eligibility:
 Bachelor's degree with an aggregate of 50 percent from recognised university.
 GATE (General Aptitude Test in Engineering) and CEED (Common Entrance Examination for Design (CEED) enrolment, which are organised by National Testing Agency and IIT, respectively.
 Or, Masters in Architecture can be pursued in Autonomous Institutions with customised entrance exams or interviews and aptitude-based entrance exams conducted by others.

Career 
Bachelor of Architecture (India) can pursure below roles in government or private organisations-
 Indian Railways.
 Development authorities in cities
 Architectural designer engaged in building industrial and commercial structures, including residences as private properties. They design building interior and exterior in collaboration with other clients.
 Architectural engineer engaged in designing buildings contributing towards improved living standards and quality of life.
 Architectural draftsman primarily responsible for making documents for architectural construction for the projects of clients. They prepare construction files and include all aspects of the design process.
 Architectural assistant engaged in working with architects who are senior professionals in areas related to facilities management and construction.
 Government architects engaged in areas of Urban housing and architecture development, development of cities, development of public works, Institute for Urban Affairs, and Organisation related to the construction of buildings.

See Also 

 Architecture of India.

References 

Architecture in India